NGC 7007 is a lenticular galaxy around 130 million light-years away from Earth in the constellation Indus. NGC 7007 was discovered by astronomer John Herschel on July 8, 1834.

Counter-rotating disk

In NGC 7007, there is counter-rotating disk of ionized gas that counter-rotates with respect to the stars. This indicates an external origin of the gas such as accretion.

See also
 NGC 7079
 List of NGC objects (7001–7840)

References

External links

Astronomical objects discovered in 1834
Lenticular galaxies
Indus (constellation)
7007
66069